Cossombrato is a comune (municipality) in the Province of Asti in the Italian region Piedmont, located about  east of Turin and about  northwest of Asti.

Cossombrato borders the following municipalities: Asti, Castell'Alfero, Chiusano d'Asti, Corsione, Montechiaro d'Asti, and Villa San Secondo.

Demographic evolution

References

External links
 www.comune.cossombrato.at.it

Cities and towns in Piedmont